The 1981 ECAC Hockey Men's Ice Hockey Tournament was the 20th tournament in league history. It was played between March 10 and March 14, 1981. Quarterfinal games were played at home team campus sites, while the 'final four' games were played at the Boston Garden in Boston, Massachusetts. By winning the tournament, Providence received the ECAC's automatic bid to the 1981 NCAA Division I Men's Ice Hockey Tournament.

Format
The tournament featured three rounds of play, all of which were single-elimination. The three teams that were division champions automatically qualified for the tournament while the remaining five seeds were given to the teams with the highest winning percentage. The top four seeds were given out to the three division champions and the top qualifier and assorted based upon winning percentage. The remaining four seeds were assigned to the other qualifiers and assorted based upon winning percentage. In the quarterfinals the first seed and eighth seed, the second seed and seventh seed, the third seed and sixth seed and the fourth seed and fifth seed played against one another. In the semifinals, the highest seed plays the lowest remaining seed while the two remaining teams play with the winners advancing to the championship game and the losers advancing to the third place game. The tournament champion receives an automatic bid to the 1981 NCAA Division I Men's Ice Hockey Tournament.

Conference standings
Note: GP = Games played; W = Wins; L = Losses; T = Ties; Pct. = Winning percentage; GF = Goals for; GA = Goals against

Bracket
Teams are reseeded after the first round

Note: * denotes overtime period(s)

Quarterfinals

(1) Clarkson vs. (8) New Hampshire

(2) Boston College vs. (7) Providence

(3) Colgate vs. (6) Northeastern

(4) Cornell vs. (5) Maine

Semifinals

(1) Clarkson vs. (7) Providence

(3) Colgate vs. (4) Cornell

Third Place

(1) Clarkson vs. (3) Colgate

Championship

(4) Cornell vs. (7) Providence

Tournament awards

All-Tournament Team
None

MOP
Kurt Kleinendorst (Providence)

References

External links
ECAC Hockey
1980–81 ECAC Hockey Standings
1980–81 NCAA Standings

ECAC Hockey Men's Ice Hockey Tournament
ECAC tournament